William, Billy or Bill O'Neill may refer to:

Politics
Bill O'Neill (Ohio politician), former member of the Ohio House of Representatives
Bill O'Neill (New Mexico politician), member of the New Mexico Senate
C. William O'Neill (1916–1978), Governor of Ohio
William O'Neill (Ohio judge) (born 1947), appellate judge and 2008 candidate for U.S. Representative from Ohio's 14th congressional district
William A. O'Neill (1930–2007), Governor of Connecticut, 1980–1991
William P. O'Neill (1874–1955), Lieutenant Governor of Indiana

Sports
Bill O'Neill (American football) (1910–2000), American football player
Bill O'Neill (baseball) (1880–1920), American baseball player
Bill O'Neill (bowler) (born 1981), American professional ten-pin bowler
Bill O'Neill (bowls) (1909–?), New Zealand lawn bowler
Billy O'Neill (rugby) (1878–1955), Welsh rugby player
Billy O'Neill (dual player) (1929–2015), Irish former Gaelic football and hurler
Billy O'Neill (footballer) (born 1919), Irish footballer
Willie O'Neill (footballer, born 1940) (1940–2011), Scottish footballer (Celtic FC)
Willie O'Neill (Wexford hurler) (born 1945), Irish hurler
Willie O'Neill (Cork hurler) (1876–1963), Irish hurler and Gaelic footballer 
Willie O'Neill (Irish footballer), Irish international footballer

Others
Bill O'Neill (media) (born 1936), News Corporation executive
Buckey O'Neill (1860–1898), Old West sheriff and U.S. Army officer killed at the Battle of San Juan Hill
 William F. O'Neil, founder of General Tire and Rubber Company
William O'Neil (born 1933), entrepreneur and stockbroker who founded the newspaper Investor's Business Daily
William O'Neill, 1st Baron O'Neill (1813–1883), Anglo-Irish hereditary peer, clergyman and musical composer
William O'Neill (Medal of Honor) (1848–?), American soldier in the Indian Wars

See also 
Bill O'Neal, American historian; see Bibliography of Wyoming history
Billy O'Neil, fictional footballer in Dream Team
William O'Neal (disambiguation)